This is a list of women classicists – female scholars, translators and writers of classical antiquity, especially ancient Greece and ancient Rome.

List

A
Ada Adler, produced the definitive edition of the huge Byzantine lexicon, Suda
Caroline Alexander, translator of the Iliad
Margaret Alford

B
Josephine Balmer
Shadi Bartsch
Mary Beard, Cambridge don
Marion Elizabeth Blake
Mary Bridges-Adams
Leslie Brubaker
Anne Pippin Burnett
Agnata Butler, first lady of Cambridge

C
Averil Cameron, professor of Late Antique and Byzantine History, Warden of Keble College, Oxford
Anne Carson, poet and translator
Elizabeth Carter
Carmen Castillo García Spanish classical philologist
Helen Chesnutt
Elizabeth A. Clark, professor specialising in patristics
Kathleen Coleman
Joan Breton Connelly
Kate Cooper

D
Anne Dacier, translator of Homer
A. M. Dale, authority on Greek tragedy
Cynthia Damon
Suzanne Dixon

E
Ulrike Egelhaaf-Gaiser
Susanna Elm

F
Wilhelmina Feemster Jashemski
Sarah Fielding
Helene P. Foley
Kathleen Freeman, author and lecturer
Olga Freidenberg

G
Laura Gibbs
Katharine Glasier
Miriam Griffin

H
Barbara Hammond, the first woman to take a double-first in Classical Moderations and Greats
Henriette Harich-Schwarzbauer
Elizabeth Hartley
Elizabeth Hazelton Haight
Edith Hamilton
Mary Hamilton
Susan Ashbrook Harvey
Jane Harrison
Gertrude Hirst
Lucy Hutchinson, translator of Lucretius

K
Marion Kennedy, founder member of Newnham College
Helen King
Alice Kober, deciphered Linear B
Elfriede Knauer
Leslie Kurke
Donna Carol Kurtz

L
Abby Leach, professor of Greek and Latin at Vassar
Mary Lefkowitz
Janet Lembke
Barbara Levick 
Jane Lightfoot, professor of Greek literature at the University of Oxford
Lady Jane Lumley, translator of Euripides

M
Grace Macurdy
Bathsua Makin, learned lady
Pamela Mensch, translator of Arrian, Herodotus and Plutarch
Carolina Michaëlis de Vasconcelos, first female professor of Romance studies at the University of Lisbon
Agnes Kirsopp Lake Michels
Lucy Myers Wright Mitchell
Judith Mossman

N
Andrea Nightingale

P
Germaine Perrin de la Boullaye
Yopie Prins
Emily James Smith Putnam

R
Nancy Sorkin Rabinowitz
Betty Radice, editor of Penguin Classics
Sarah Parker Remond
Christiane Reitz
Emeline Hill Richardson
Amy Richlin, authority on ancient sex
Deborah Roberts
Jacqueline de Romilly
Ursula Rothe
Ingrid D. Rowland
Sarah Ruden, translator of the Aeneid
Meike Rühl

S
Anna Maria van Schurman, the first female university student
Ruth Scodel
Enid Stacy
Edith Sharpley
Gertrude Smith
Diane Arnson Svarlien
Alicia Stallings, poet and translator
Jenny Strauss Clay
Anna Swanwick, promoter of higher education for women

T
Clotilde Tambroni*Birgitte Thott, translator of Seneca
Dorothy Tarrant, first female UK professor of Greek
Lily Ross Taylor
Gail Trimble
Susan Treggiari

V
Luisa Sigea de Velasco
Margaret Verrall
Elizabeth Visser
Renée Vivien

W
Ute Wartenberg
Simone Weil
Mary Estelle White
Marie Victoria Williams
Emily Wilson
Anja Wolkenhauer

Y
Louise Youtie, papyrologist

Z
Annie Nicolette Zadoks Josephus Jitta
Froma Zeitlin

References

Classicists